Cade Montgomery Mays (born April 26, 1999) is an American football guard for the Carolina Panthers of the National Football League (NFL). He played college football at Georgia before transferring to Tennessee.

College career
Mays started his college career at Georgia. He played there for two years before transferring to Tennessee. He played for the Volunteers for two seasons.

Professional career

Mays was drafted by the Carolina Panthers in the sixth round, 199th overall, of the 2022 NFL Draft. Mays made his NFL debut in Week 7 against the Tampa Bay Buccaneers. He made his first start in Week 12 against the Denver Broncos. He appeared in 11 games and made two starts in his rookie season.

References

External links

 Carolina Panthers bio
 Georgia Bulldogs bio
 Tennessee Volunteers bio

1999 births
Living people
Players of American football from Knoxville, Tennessee
American football offensive guards
Tennessee Volunteers football players
Georgia Bulldogs football players
Carolina Panthers players